AlkB homolog 1, histone H2A dioxygenase is a protein that in humans is encoded by the ALKBH1 gene.

Function

This gene encodes a homolog to the E. coli alkB gene product. The E. coli alkB protein is part of the adaptive response mechanism of DNA alkylation damage repair. It is involved in damage reversal by oxidative demethylation of 1-methyladenine and 3-methylcytosine. [provided by RefSeq, Jul 2008].

References

Further reading